Bob Glouberman (born May 3, 1968) is an American actor who has appeared in over 100 television shows, mainly sitcoms.

Biography
Glouberman was born in Brooklyn, New York. He has had recurring roles on the television shows Without a Trace, The Closer (the CBS Tom Selleck sitcom), Spin City, Lateline, and Mad About You, as well as recurring voiceover roles on the cartoons Handy Manny, Digimon Tamers, Rave Master, and Men in Black: The Series. He has also appeared on Desperate Housewives, The Closer (the Kyra Sedgewick drama), Ugly Betty, Close to Home, Curb Your Enthusiasm, Arrested Development, iCarly, Malcolm in the Middle, The West Wing, and ER.  His unique look and demeanor have led him to play on several occasions the role of the 'nightmare blind date' to many of Hollywood's preeminent leading ladies, including Carmen Electra in Fat Actress, Calista Flockhart in Ally McBeal, and Jenny McCarthy in the film Dirty Love. He is also the co-founder of the Los Angeles Race Fantastique  (or, LARF for short). LARF is an elaborate scavenger hunt which runs public races, private races, and daily races for tourists in Cozumel, Mexico, St Thomas Virgin Islands and Los Angeles.

Filmography

Anime dubbing
 Digimon Tamers - Shibumi
 Rave Master - Mikan, Ruby

Film
 The Artist - Director #3
 Digimon: The Movie - Willis
 The Barefoot Executive - Executive
 Red Riding Hood - Scoutmaster
 Win a Date With Tad Hamilton! - Rosalee's Limo Driver
 Dirty Love - Mylo
 Deep Impact - uncredited
 Napoleon (1995) (voice) .... Lone Lorikeet/Wombat/Wallaby#2/Desert Mice
 My Dinner with Andre the Giant - lead

Television
American Woman - Mr. Knave (1 episode, 2018)
 New Girl - Rabbi
 Glee - Mitzvah University president
 2 Broke Girls - Garry
 Suburgatory - Lansky
 Getting On - Doctor
 The Office - Mr. Gradenko
 Arrested Development - David the Aide
 General Hospital - Mr. Jenkins
 The Ben Show - Attorney
 Switched at Birth - Mr. Feldman
 Criminal Minds - Attorney
 Zeke and Luther - Attorney
 Who's Still Standing .... Contestant (1 episode; Reality Show, 2011)
 Jonas .... Mr. Spencer (1 episode, 2009)
 Desperate Housewives .... Mohel (1 episode, 2007)
 Ugly Betty .... Doctor (1 episode, 2007)
 Close to Home .... Sanders Falcone (1 episode, 2007)
 Crumbs .... Lawyer (1 episode, 2006)
 Handy Manny .... Sherman (10 episodes, 2006)
 Curb Your Enthusiasm .... Matt (1 episode, 2005)
 Without a Trace .... Polygraph Examiner / ... (2 episodes, 2005)
 Inconceivable .... Mr. Jacoby (2 episodes, 2005)
 The L Word .... Older Man (1 episode, 2005)
 Malcolm in the Middle .... Gerry (1 episode, 2005)
 Arrested Development .... Doctor / ... (2 episodes, 2005)
 Fat Actress .... Carmen's Friend (1 episode, 2005)
 Crossing Jordan .... Mr. Gottenblatt (1 episode, 2004)
 Strong Medicine .... Bug Scientist (1 episode, 2003)t
 My Wife and Kids .... Photographer (1 episode, 2003)
 Russian Roulette .... Contestant (1 episode; Reality Show, 2003)
 One on One .... Howard McIntyre (1 episode, 2002)
 The Division .... Drew (1 episode, 2002)
 The West Wing .... Terry Beckwith (1 episode, 2001)
 Spin City .... Reporter #2 (6 episodes, 2000)
 Manhattan, AZ .... Dr. Keeler (1 episode, 2000)
 L.A. 7 .... Fast Food Customer #2 (1 episode, 2000)
 Battery Park .... District Attorney (1 episode, 2000)
 Grown Ups .... Mr. Barris (1 episode, 2000)
 Providence .... Katz (1 episode, 1999)
 Mad About You .... Alan Kaufman (2 episodes, 1999)
 Ally McBeal .... Wally Pike (1 episode, 1998)
 Godzilla: The Series (1 episode, 1998)
 Conrad Bloom .... Doctor (1 episode, 1998)
 3rd Rock from the Sun .... Neighbor (1 episode, 1998)
 LateLine .... Prompter Techie / ... (6 episodes, 1998)
 The Closer .... Brother Thomas (2 episodes, 1998)
 ER .... Jeff (1 episode, 1998)
 Caroline in the City .... Dr. Dorfman (1 episode, 1998)
 Life's Work .... Star Trek Conventioneer (1 episode, 1997)
 Common Law .... David Kurn (1 episode, 1996)
 Murphy Brown .... Owen Tyler (1 episode, 1996)
 Ellen .... Book Club Pundit / ... (2 episodes, 1995)
 The Barefoot Executive (1995) (TV) .... Executive
 Living Single .... Technician (1 episode, 1995) ... aka My Girls
 Family Matters .... Bellhop (1 episode, 1995)
 The Wayans Bros. .... Carjacker (1 episode, 1995)
 Monty .... Rappaport (1 episode, 1994)
 Flying Blind .... Heel (1 episode, 1993)
 Classic Concentration .... himself/contestant (finale, 1991)

Video games
 Hitman: Blood Money
 Skylanders: SuperChargers
 Ultimate Spider-Man - Rhino
 X-Men: Destiny - Caliban

References

External links

1968 births
Living people
American male television actors
American male voice actors
Place of birth missing (living people)